Heskestad is a village in Lund municipality in Rogaland county, Norway. Heskestad Station is a now-closed railway station located in the village.

Heskestad is also a parish in the Church of Norway.  Heskestad Church, dating back to 1904, is located in the village and it is the church for the parish, serving the western part of Lund.

Heskestad was the administrative centre of the municipality of Heskestad which existed from 1838 until 1965.

References

Villages in Rogaland
Lund, Norway